The 2013 NCAA Division III football season, part of college football in the United States organized by the National Collegiate Athletic Association at the Division III level, began on August 31, 2013, and concluded with the National Championship Game of the NCAA Division III Football Championship on December 20, 2013, at Salem Football Stadium in Salem, Virginia. This was the twenty-first consecutive title game held in Salem. The Wisconsin–Whitewater Warhawks defeated the Mount Union Purple Raiders, 52–14, to win their fifth national title.

The 2013 Gagliardi Trophy was awarded to quarterback Kevin Burke from Mount Union.

Conference changes and new programs

Conference standings

Conference summaries

Postseason
Twenty-four conferences met the requirements for an automatic ("Pool A") bid to the playoffs. Besides the NESCAC, which does not participate in the playoffs, four conferences had no Pool A bid. The MASCAC and SAA were in the first year of the two-year waiting period; the SCAC and UAA had only four members, three short of the requirement. The American Southwest retained its Pool A bid despite falling below seven active Division III members, but entered the two-year grace period.

Schools not in Pool A conferences were eligible for Pool B. The number of Pool B bids was determined by calculating the ratio of Pool A conferences to schools in those conferences and applying that ratio to the number of Pool B schools. The 24 Pool A conferences contained 203 schools, an average of 8.5 teams per conference. Twenty-seven schools were in Pool B, enough for three bids.

The remaining five playoff spots were at-large ("Pool C") teams.

Playoff bracket

* Home team    † Overtime

References